Dave the Barbarian is an American animated television series created by Doug Langdale for Disney Channel. The show centers on a barbarian named Dave and his friends and family, who go on surreal Medieval-themed adventures. The series premiered on January 23, 2004 and ended on January 22, 2005, with a total of one season with 21 episodes.

Premise 
The series takes place in the kingdom of Udrogoth during the Middle Ages. It centers on Dave (voiced by Danny Cooksey), a powerful yet cowardly barbarian who lives with his fashionable yet self-centered older sister Candy (Erica Luttrell) and feisty younger sister Fang (Tress MacNeille). His parents, Throktar and Glimia, are the King and Queen, but are away "fighting evil" across the world (though they sometimes communicate via a magic crystal ball or cauldron), and have left Candy in charge of the kingdom as Princess Regent while Dave is supposed to defend the kingdom (since he is the biggest). Together the three siblings, along with their gluttonous and mildly incompetent "wizard" uncle Oswidge, are left to run and protect the kingdom from the villainous yet dimwitted Dark Lord Chuckles the Silly Piggy (Paul Rugg).

There is a Narrator, referred to either as "the Narrator" or "the Storyteller", voiced by Jeff Bennett. He is able to talk to the characters of the show, and vice versa, which breaks the fourth wall to the extent where he was once captured by Dark Lord Chuckles the Silly Piggy and was forced to tell the story according to his kidnapper's commands.

Characters

Main
Dave (voiced by Danny Cooksey) – At 16, the middle child and only brother of the three siblings. Dave is a muscular and very strong barbarian war-prince who is very sensitive to pain and would rather knit and cook than fight evil. He is also afraid of many things and at least once an episode, he will be frightened somehow and shriek his high-pitched, effeminate scream. He is also allergic to many things. According to Fang, Dave wanted to be a barbarian when he was young, but thought a barbarian was a librarian who also cuts hair. Dave's catchphrases are "Bejabbers!" and "Please don't hurt me!"
Candy (voiced by Erica Luttrell) – At 17, the oldest child of the three siblings. Left in charge while the king and queen are away, Candy has a contemporary "valley girl" attitude and would rather shop and hang out than rule a kingdom. Candy's main ability is her martial arts skills. She is the kingdom's most beautiful girl and she's rather selfish, but gets over that in a small way while helping Hamwise and his wife defeat the nefarious Invisigoths. Candy has used the quote "Don't mess with the princess" on a number of occasions and has referred to herself also as a Barbarian. She has displayed the most strength out of the family often when it comes to monsters destroying a shop or so; whether or not she is stronger than Dave remains unseen but out of the two, she is the one willing to use it.
Fang (voiced by Tress MacNeille) – At 9, youngest of the three siblings. Fang is a very rambunctious and uncivilized young warrior who loves to smash things. She has long red hair in a ponytail. She is the butt of a running joke in which she is often mistaken for a monkey, hence her catchphrase, "Not a monkey!" However, she frequently acts and appears to look like a monkey and during one episode she finds a tribe of monkeys that exactly resemble her. She is too small to fight most of the time and resents Dave (who is very strong) because of his cowardice. She aspires to be a barbarian warrior and often reprimands Dave for his gentleness and niche interests. She secretly likes to play with dolls. Fang wields a spear in combat, as well as kicking, biting, and punching. Her wardrobe (specifically, the animal skin tunic and bone in her hair) incorporates elements of both Pebbles and Bamm-Bamm of The Flintstones. 
Oswidge (voiced by Kevin Michael Richardson) – Dave, Fang and Candy's uncle. A rather clumsy sorcerer who often wreaks havoc with his spells rather than being useful. In "Sorcerer Material," it is revealed that Oswidge did not attend sorcery school; he merely worked in the cafeteria. He is an avid foodie, being a skilled chef and hash slinger; his favorite foods are ham and "Nut Logs," which he attacks a server to receive. Like his niece Fang, he secretly likes to play with dolls. He presents a rather unkempt appearance. Despite his inadequacy as a sorcerer, his knowledge of magic surpasses that of the rest of the family.
Faffy (voiced by Frank Welker) – The family's dumb pig-shaped pet dragon.  Unlike most dragons, he breathes lightning and is domesticated, plus he does not have a tail. He does possess a wild streak that can be revealed when around other dragons, particularly evil ones with rebellious attitudes. The Narrator has mentioned that Faffy has a one-digit IQ.
Lula (voiced by Estelle Harris) – Dave's shrill, impatient, sarcastic, and enchanted sword. Her main ability is shooting lightning from the tip of her blade. She was once the sword of Argon the Ageless, with whom she was infatuated, but was used by Argon as the nose of a snowman, and left in the melted puddle for centuries. It's revealed that Lula is related to other mystical weapons of different kinds, her older sister being Mjolnir, the hammer of Thor, and her cousin being the trident of Poseidon.

Supporting
King Throktar and Queen Glimia (voiced by Kevin Michael Richardson and Erica Luttrell) – The proper rulers of Udrogoth, and the parents of Dave, Candy and Fang. They are away fighting evil around the world, though they can communicate to their children via Oswidge's crystal ball, a magical cauldron, or other forms of fantasy telecommunication. Occasionally the King and Queen are on the phone call while in a perilous situation, such as a battle with zombie spiders.
The Narrator/Storyteller (voiced by Jeff Bennett) – The narrator of the series. He has never been seen in an episode.
Dinky and Cheezette (voiced by Erica Luttrell and Tress MacNeille) – Princess Candy's best friends, who are sometimes unsupportive – and wisely so – towards her actions. They are as obsessive about fashion, clothes, and social lives as Candy is.
Mrs. Gert Bogmelon (voiced by Lisa Kaplan) – A witch-like shopkeeper who loves money and loves to rip off her customers. She can be cowed by Fang and other aggressive people but takes advantage of meek people like Dave. She sells evil weasels, mystical swords, and other plot-related paraphernalia, such as used T-shirts for sporting events.
Twinkle the Marvel Horse (voiced by Jeff Bennett) – A magical pony with a rainbow-colored tail. He has extreme depression and possible psychosis, apparently due to being left on his own in the stable all the time. He often talks about his dreams, which are very disturbing.  He is capable of flight, though he has no wings. His manner of speech is a parody of Christopher Walken. He appears in the episodes 'Ned Frischman: Man of Tomorrow', 'Beef!', 'The Terror of Mecha-Dave', 'The Lost Race of Reeber', 'A Pig's Story', 'I Love Neddy' and 'Fiends and Family'.

Antagonists
The Dark Lord Chuckles the Silly Piggy (voiced by Paul Rugg) – A pig with a high-collared cape (and equally high voice) bent on ruling Udrogoth and the main antagonist of the show. Chuckles lives in a castle on the outskirts of the kingdom. He possesses the Mystic Amulet of Hogswineboar (named so because hogs, swine, and boars are all synonyms for the word 'pig'). This grants him amazing mystical powers such as telekinesis, shape-shifting, blasting magic to rival Lula's, and conjuration. He is also a whiz with technology, as evidenced by the Mecha-Dave. His schemes usually rely on a particular gimmick (like giant clams, giant ducks, evil pastries, or evil furniture). His catchphrase is: (whenever he gets hurt) "Ooh, my little piggy [insert body part]". It was also revealed in one episode (the Princess and the Peabrains') that he has a nephew named Knuckles the Silly Piggy, who wants to be the Harvest Hog instead of a dark lord of evil.
Malsquando (voiced by Rob Paulsen) – An evil sorcerer and Oswidge's rival. He has an obsession with taking over the world and making money. He was revealed to be a member of the Evil Sorcerers' union. He also runs a shop that cures hiccats (magical hiccups that produce cats from one's mouth). Malsquando reveals that while he attended sorcery school, Oswidge merely worked in the cafeteria, thus invalidating Oswidge as a wizard. Lula expresses that she finds his accent attractive. His speaking pattern is based on that of Jonathan Harris.
Quosmir (voiced by Michael McShane) – The god of freshly laundered trousers, overused punctuation and possibly other random and ridiculous things. He has mommy issues and carries a security blanket known as his "ni-ni lankie". He often experiences short-term memory loss and attention deficit disorder. He is a green skinned naga-like giant with the lower half of a snake instead of legs; he is always wearing a blue cape and a combover. He has a severe inferiority complex that is only exacerbated in the presence of his mother. He has immense magical powers including flight, super-speed, and flaming loogies.
Princess Irmaplotz and Queen Zonthara (voiced by  Melissa and Joan Rivers) – The evil sorceress princess of Hyrogoth that is trying to destroy Dave (or more likely she just wants to make Dave's life miserable). Her mother Zonthara is the ruler of Hyrogoth, and keeps on trying to teach Irmaplotz to be more evil. Her father is good, making her half-evil. Earlier in the show, Dave and Irmaplotz fell in love over their similar reading habits, love of bad poetry, and similar allergies. However, after careful consideration, Dave ended the relationship due to Irmaplotz's desire for evil, which contradicts Dave's desire to do good. After this, Irmaplotz becomes an antagonist, seeking revenge for being dumped. Irmaplotz is nearsighted, occasionally wearing glasses, but avoids wearing them in fear of looking "bookish." In the episode "The Cow Says Moon," Irmaplotz reveals she still has feelings for Dave when she compliments him while still saying that vengeance will be hers.
Ned Frischman (voiced by Richard Steven Horvitz) – A nerd who works at a pants factory in the year 1994. He gains a radioactive zipper which he uses to travel back into time to attempt conquering the world by using the advanced technology of the future, such as the Game Guy (a parody of a Game Boy), and a joke book from the 1940s. The humans become addicted to playing the same game on their Game Guys and they clamor for new batteries, which Frischman repeatedly provides by traveling to the future and purchasing them. He then uses the pursuit of batteries to enslave Urdugoth inhabitants into building pyramids and other monuments in his name. He is defeated by Faffy, Lula and Twinkle the Marvel Horse, who all do not have thumbs and therefore did not become addicted to Game Guys.

Production 
The show was created and written by Doug Langdale. After premiering on Disney in 2004, it began broadcasting on Toon Disney a year later. In Latin America, the show was broadcast on Jetix.

Much like its predecessors Hägar the Horrible, The Flintstones and the short-lived The Roman Holidays, Dave the Barbarian juxtaposes both the ancient and modern. Candy, for example, shops in the local mall and uses the crystal ball for online shopping sprees.

Occasionally, the series breaks the fourth wall with a character complaining about a plot, directly addressing the audience, or communicating to the narrator. Characters can sometimes be offended by how the narrator describes them, including Oswidge in "Sorcerer Material." In "The Maddening Sprite of the Stump," the show's narrator skips over a fight scene, asking viewers to imagine an epic battle and explaining that "a low budget show" like Dave the Barbarian did not have the expenses to animate such a scene. In "A Pig's Story," the series antagonist realizes the show's narration leads to his losses, so he types favorable situations and hypnotizes the Storyteller into reading the voice-over, culminating in a theme song for the antagonist; ultimately, the narrator's laryngitis makes him lose his voice and foil the evil plan.

Episodes

Season 1 (2004–05)

Broadcast 
The series was broadcast internationally, including on the Family Channel in Canada, on STS in Russia, on Disney Cinemagic in the United Kingdom, on Jetix in Latin America, on MBC 3 in Arabia, on SIC in Portugal, and on Super RTL in Germany.

Awards and nominations 
Annie Awards
2005 – Storyboarding in an Animated Television Production – Wendy Grieb for episode "The Maddening Sprite of the Stump" (Won)
2005 – Writing in an Animated Television Production – Evan Gore & Heather Lombard for episode "Ned Frischman: Man of Tomorrow" (Nominated)

References

External links 

 
 

2000s American animated television series
2004 American television series debuts
2005 American television series endings
Disney Channel original programming
Disney XD original programming
Jetix original programming
Television series by Disney Television Animation
Television series created by Doug Langdale
English-language television shows
Television series set in the Middle Ages